Jean-Louis Martin may refer to:

 Jean-Louis Martin (equestrian) (born 1939), French equestrian
 Jean-Louis Martin (politician) (1823-1861), political figure in Quebec